Stonecoal Lake Wildlife Management Area is located on  in Lewis and Upshur counties, east of Weston, West Virginia, United States. The wildlife management area is centered on Stonecoal Lake, a hydroelectric project owned by Allegheny Energy.

References

Winters, Kelly "Stonecoal Lake." e-WV: The West Virginia Encyclopedia. 5 November 2010. Web. 25 November 2015

External links
West Virginia DNR District 3 Wildlife Management Areas

Wildlife management areas of West Virginia
Protected areas of Lewis County, West Virginia
Protected areas of Upshur County, West Virginia
Bodies of water of Lewis County, West Virginia
Bodies of water of Upshur County, West Virginia
Reservoirs in West Virginia
IUCN Category V
Protected areas established in 1972
1972 establishments in West Virginia